The 2020 Copa Verde Finals was the final two-legged tie that decided the 2020 Copa Verde, the 7th season of the Copa Verde, Brazil's regional cup football tournament organised by the Brazilian Football Confederation.

The finals were contested in a two-legged home-and-away format between Brasiliense, from Distrito Federal, and Remo, from Pará.

Brasiliense won the first leg 2–1, and Remo won the second leg by the same score, which meant the title was decided by a penalty shoot-out, which Brasiliense won 5–4 to claim their first Copa Verde title.

Teams

Road to the final
Note: In all scores below, the score of the home team is given first.

Format
The finals were played on a home-and-away two-legged basis. If tied on aggregate, the penalty shoot-out was used to determine the winner.

Matches

First leg

Second leg

{| width="100%"
|valign="top" width="40%"|

See also
2021 Copa do Brasil

References

Copa Verde Finals